Socialist Alliance  may refer to:

Albanian Socialist Alliance Party
Alternative Socialist Alliance - Independents (in Bulgaria)
Scottish Socialist Alliance
Socialist Alliance (Australia)
Socialist Alliance (Burkina Faso)
Socialist Alliance (England)
London Socialist Alliance
Socialist Alliance (Mexico)
Socialist Alliance (Sri Lanka)
Socialist Alliance Party (in Romania)
Socialist Alliance of Working People of Yugoslavia
Socialist Environmental Alliance (in Northern Ireland)
Socialist Labour Alliance (in Ireland)
Socialist Popular Alliance Party (in Egypt)
Socialist Trade and Labor Alliance (in the United States)
Socialist Youth Alliance (in Portugal)
Welsh Socialist Alliance
Young Socialist Alliance (in the United States)

See also
 Anti-Capitalist Alliance